Sir Robin Christian Howard Niblett  (born 20 August 1961) is a British specialist in international relations. He has been the Director of Chatham House (the Royal Institute of International Affairs) since January 2007.

Education and personal life

He is the son of Alan and Christine Niblett. In 1990, he married Trisha de Borchgrave, with whom he has two daughters.

He was educated at Cottesmore School and Charterhouse. He studied at New College, Oxford, and obtained a BA in Modern Languages in 1984, followed by MPhil in 1993 and DPhil in International Relations in 1995. His doctoral thesis was entitled The European Community and the Central European Three, 1989–92 : a study of the Community as an international actor.

Early career

On leaving Oxford, he was a musician 1985–87 (he lists electric guitar among his recreations in Who's Who).

Center for Strategic and International Studies

He was resident associate at the Center for Strategic and International Studies, Washington, DC 1988–91 and their Europe representative 1992–97. He was director, strategic planning, 1997–2000; executive vice-president and chief operating officer, 2001–06. During his last two years at CSIS, he also served as director of the CSIS Europe Program and its Initiative for a Renewed Transatlantic Partnership.

Other roles

Niblett has participated as a panellist at conferences and events around the world as an expert on transatlantic relations and European order. He has given evidence to the House of Commons Defence Select Committee about the future of NATO and European defence, to the Foreign Affairs Committee about the US-UK relationship and the future of UK government policy towards the European Union, and to the Select Committee on Soft Power and the UK's Influence. He has appeared as an analyst on these topics in major media including the BBC and CNN and has written and commented for prominent newspapers including the Financial Times, Washington Post, The Guardian and the Daily Telegraph.
 
He is the editor and contributing author of the book America and a Changed World: A Question of Leadership and has edited and co-authored books on transatlantic cooperation and European integration. Most recently he authored a chapter in the book Influencing Tomorrow: Future Challenges for British Foreign Policy.
 
He is a non-executive director of Fidelity European Values Investment Trust since 2010, member and former Chairman of the World Economic Forum's Global Agenda Council on Europe.

He chaired the British Academy forum on language needs for UK public policy making and implementation and is currently Chairman of the Experts Group for the 2014 NATO Summit.

Honours

Niblett was appointed Companion of the Order of St Michael and St George (CMG) in the 2015 New Year Honours for services to promoting the UK as a global centre for foreign policy and Knight Commander of the Order of St Michael and St George (KCMG) in the 2022 Birthday Honours for services to international relations and British foreign policy.

References

External links

1961 births
Alumni of New College, Oxford
Chief operating officers
Council and directors of Chatham House
Knights Commander of the Order of St Michael and St George
Living people
People educated at Charterhouse School